The 1870 Shrewsbury by-election was fought on 21 September 1870.  The by-election was fought due to the Death of the incumbent MP of the Liberal Party, William James Clement.  It was won by the Conservative candidate Douglas Straight.

References

1870 elections in the United Kingdom
1870 in England
19th century in Shropshire
Shrewsbury
By-elections to the Parliament of the United Kingdom in Shropshire constituencies